BVSS may refer to:

Bedok View Secondary School, a secondary school in Bedok, Singapore
Brazos Valley Sudbury School, a defunct Sudbury school in Waller County, Texas